The Columbian School in Raton, New Mexico, at 700 N. 2nd St., is a Moderne-style school which was built as a Works Progress Administration project in 1939.  It was listed on the National Register of Historic Places in 1996.

It was designed by architect Willard C. Kruger.  Additions to the school in 1950 and 1970 do not detract from the historical character.

References

External links

Schools in New Mexico
National Register of Historic Places in Colfax County, New Mexico
Moderne architecture in the United States
Buildings and structures completed in 1939